Richard Nowell (born 29 December 1975, Croydon, Greater London) is an English ex-professional cricket player with Surrey County Cricket Club in the period 1995–6. His batting style was left-hand bat and his bowling style was slow left-arm orthodox.

Nowell was educated at Trinity School of John Whitgift.

References

English cricketers
Surrey cricketers
1975 births
Living people
Cricketers from Croydon
Hertfordshire cricketers
People educated at Trinity School of John Whitgift